Edgewood Lake is a lake in the southern part of the city of Providence, Rhode Island.

References

Geography of Providence, Rhode Island
Lakes of Providence County, Rhode Island
Lakes of Rhode Island